Gibberella intricans is a fungal plant pathogen.  It is an opportunistic pathogen of durians such as  Durio graveolens and D. kutejensis.

References

External links
 Index Fungorum
 USDA ARS Fungal Database

Fungal plant pathogens and diseases
intricans
Fungi described in 1930